Stiernspetz is a Swedish surname. Notable people with the surname include:

Gustaf Stiernspetz (1889–1966), Swedish sports shooter
Yngve Stiernspetz (1887–1945), Swedish gymnast 

Swedish-language surnames